The following list consists of concepts that are derived from both Sikh and Indian tradition. The main purpose of this list is to disambiguate multiple spellings, to make note of spellings no longer in use for these concepts, to define the concept in one or two lines, to make it easy for one to find and pin down specific concepts, and to provide a guide to unique concepts of Sikhism all in one place.

A
 Amrit elixir of immortality - the sanctified nectar or sugar water substitute used in ceremonies. It is prepared by stirring it in an iron bowl with the double-edged sword and continuous recitation of five banis by the five selected members of the Khalsa.

 Amritdhari baptized Sikh who has undergone the Khalsa ceremony. According to Sikh Reht Maryada, any person who is initiated into the Khalsa is called Amrit Dhari.
 Amrit Sanchar, Amrit Sanskar Baptism (sanchar means ceremony)

B
 Bani verses. An abbreviation of Gurbani, applied to any of the writings which appear in the Guru Granth Sahib.
 Bhagat Bani Any of the writings which appear in the Guru Granth Sahib which were not written by the Gurus.

D
 Daan  Charity.  One of the 3 petitions - Naam, Daan, Ishnan.
 Dasband, daswand, dasvand 10% of earnings donated to the less advantaged.
 Dastar Turban (Pugree). It is an inseparable part of Sikh dress and is mandatory for a Sikh to tie his turban according to Sri Guru Granth Sahib and the Sikh 'Code of Conduct'.
 Dharam di Kirat To earn an honest living.

G
 Gatka Sikh martial art
 Gurdwara, gurudwara Place of worship, meaning "God's door", or God's place
 Gurbani Collective writings of the Sikh Gurus. (See bani.)
 Gurmukh Person who is spiritually centered.  (See manmukh.) A person who lives within the will of God and accepts all good and bad that happens to oneself without question or annoyance.
 Gurmukhi The written form of Punjabi used in the Sikh scriptures propagated by Guru Nanak and Guru Angad. Gurmukhi script is also called 'Paintis Akhri' because it contains thirty-five letters.
 Gutka Sahib Prayerbook containing daily prayers.

H
 Hankar Pride, one of the five vices.

I
 Ishnan  Purity of mind and body.  One of the three petitions - Naam, Daan, Ishnan.

J
 Japu, Japō Recitation (from Jap: Recite).
 Japji Sahib The first 8 pages of the Siri Guru Granth Sahib (Sikh holy scripture), consisting of hymns composed by Guru Nanak.

K
 Kakke Panj (5) K's that must be worn by Sikhs.
 Kachha/kachchhera Short undergarments – one of the Five Ks that a Khalsa Sikh must wear. It is a symbol of self-control.
 Kam  Lust, one of the 5 vices.
 Kanga Comb – one of the Five Ks that a Khalsa Sikh must west. It is a symbol of discipline.
 Kara A loose steel bracelet – one of the Five Ks that Sikhs must wear.  It is a symbol of restraint.
 Kaur Princess.  Female Sikh middle name or surname.
 Kesh Unshorn hair – one of the Five Ks that Sikhs must wear.
 Khanda Emblem of Sikh faith that symbolizes the four pillars of Sikh belief. It consists of four symbolic weapons.
 Khalsa Pure – must carry panj kakkar.
 Kirpan Short sword – one of the Five Ks that a Khalsa Sikh must wear.  It is a symbol of the fight against injustice and religious oppression.
 Kirat karō (kirat karni)  One of the three primary pillars of Sikhism, the others being Naam Japo and Wand kay Shako. The term means to earn an honest, pure and dedicated living.
 Krodh Anger.  One of the 5 vices.
 Kurahit kurahat The cardinal sins for the Sikhs. These are cutting, trimming, shaving or removing hairs from one’s body, eating meat, using tobacco, or any other intoxicant in any form or committing adultery.

L 
 Lobh  Greed, one of the 5 vices.

M 
 Manmukh A self-centered person, contrast gurmukh. A person who lives within the will of the Mind as opposed to the will of god.
 Moh Attachment. One of the 5 vices.
 Mul Mantra Basic statement of creed.

N 
 Naam Name.  Remembrance of the divine name.
 Nām Japō, Naam japna Recitation and meditation on the Naam of the Lord.
 Nitnem Daily prayers which begin with Japji Sahib and are written in a Gutka (prayerbook).

P 
 Panj The number 5
 Panj dokh The 5 thieves/betrayers. Ahankar (pride), Kam (lust), Krodh (anger), Lobh (greed) and Moh (worldly attachment)
 Panj weapons Chardi Kala (positive energy),  Daan (charity), Dayan (kindness) Nimarta (humility), Santokh (contentment)
 Panj virtues Daya (compassion), Nimrata (humility), Pyare (love), Santokh (contentment) and Sat (truth).
 Panj Kakke The Five Ks; the five external symbols worn by both male and female Sikhs.  The name of each symbol starts with the letter k (kakka); kaccha, kanga, kara, kesh and kirpan.
 Patit Apostate.

S
 Sangat Society (congregation). Compare Panth.
 Sarbat da Bhalla  Welfare of mankind
 Seva Service. One of the 2 foundations of Sikhism. Three varieties of seva are sanctioned in the Sikh lore: that rendered through the corporal instrument (tan), that through the mental apparatus (man) and that through the material wherewithal (dhan). There are 4 types of Seva:
 Dhan di Seva – the one people are most familiar with. Doing seva by performing deeds of service and virtue.
 Mann Di Seva – done by doing Simran. Cleansing the Soul of polluted thoughts and Maya.
 Guru di Seva – by having your Mann attuned to his Naam.
 Satgur ki Seva.
 Shabad, Śábda The hymns contained in Sikh scriptures.
 Shaheed Title used before the name of a person who has died as a Sikh martyr.
 Simran The remembrance of Waheguru. Guru Nanak formed a new type of Bakti beginning with Simran and Jap of Waheguru Gurmantar.
 Singh Lion. Male Sikh middle or surname title.
 Sloka  Stanza. The Sanskrit epic metre formed of thirty-two syllables: verses of two lines (distich) of sixteen syllables each or in four half-lines (hemistich) of each syllables each. Japu (recitation) comprises an introductory sloka, 38 stanzas traditionally called pauris and a concluding sloka attributed by some to Guru Angad.
Sukhmani the Psalm of Peace.

T
Tankhah  Salary, payment also social offense – He is not to commit any of the social offences (Tankhah), such as giving dowry, using liquors and intoxicants, raising monuments over graves and associating with apostates.
 Turban   Dastar (Pugree).  It is an inseparable part of Sikh dress and is mandatory for a Sikh to tie his turban according to Guru Granth Sahib and the Sikh 'Code of Conduct'.

W
 Waheguru (ਵਾਹਗੁਰੂ)  A term used in Sikhism to refer to God as described in Guru Granth Sahib.
 Wand Shakna  To share one's bounty with others (See daan.)

References

External links
Sikh Terms From Sikhs.org

Glossaries of religion

Wikipedia glossaries using description lists